Hoa Binh Football Club is a Vietnamese professional football club based in Hoa Binh, Vietnam that competes in the V.League 2.

History
Hoa Binh FC was officially unveiled on 22 April 2021 with the motto Tự hào Tây Bắc". The club named former Vietnam national team player Lê Quốc Vượng as their inaugural manager. Though the club was newly formed, they were officially recognized as Trieu Minh Football Club having been relocated to Hoa Binh. Hence, the club would begin their existence in the Vietnamese Football League Second Division instead of starting in the fourth tier Vietnamese Football League Third Division. Their debut match of the 2022 season was played on 4 May 2021 against Hai Nam Vinh Yen Vinh Phuc. Hoa Binh gained promotion to the V.League 2 in their inaugural season after defeating Dong Nai 3–0 in the Final Round.

Stadium
The club plays their home matches at Hoa Binh Stadium. Their training grounds is located in the Lương Sơn district.

Current squad

References

External links
Official website
Facebook page 

Hoa Binh
Association football clubs established in 2021
2021 establishments in Vietnam